Ada Williams (June 2, 1913 – August 12, 1975) was an American film actress.

Biography

She was the daughter of Calvin Williams of Knoxville, Kentucky.

In 1927, she won the Miss Florida beauty contest, and became first runner-up in the Miss United States contest.

Her film career began with a role was in Joy Street (1929) for the William Fox Film corporation. As she was 16 at the time, her contract needed to be validated by the California court system. She was chaperoned by her mother, A. G. Williams. In 1929, at the age of 18, she was married to William Thomas Ince, a son of a movie producer. She took the name Ada Ince, which appeared in her subsequent film credits. 

They were divorced in 1934. The following year, she was married to Ray Dodge, a middle-distance runner who competed in the 1924 Summer Olympics. Their daughters were named Diana Ada and Darlene Rae Dodge.

Filmography

 Joy Street (1929) as Beverly
 Common Clay (1930) as Hugh's sister
 The Vanishing Shadow (1934, Serial) as Gloria Grant
 The Fighting Rookie (1934) as Molly Malone
 Frontier Days (1934) as Beth Wilson
 Stolen Harmony (1935) as Girl in Sextette (uncredited)
 Rainbow's End (1935) as Gwen Gibson (final film role)

References

External links

1913 births
1975 deaths
American film actresses
20th-century American actresses